Khairi Barki (born 10 October 1995) is an Algerian footballer who plays for AS Aïn M'lila in the Algerian Ligue 2.

Career
In 2019, Khairi Barki signed a contract with CR Belouizdad.

In 2020, He signed a two-year contract with ES Sétif.

References 

1990 births
Living people
Association football goalkeepers
Algerian footballers
CRB Aïn Fakroun players
JS Saoura players
DRB Tadjenanet players
ES Sétif players
WA Tlemcen players
CR Belouizdad players
21st-century Algerian people